San Diego Building Trades Council v. Garmon, 359 U.S. 236 (1959), is a US labor law case, concerning the scope of federal preemption against state law for labor rights.

Background 
Garmon had a business selling lumber in California. The San Diego Building Trades Council was a labor union that wanted Garmon only to hire workers who were union members, or applied to join the union within 30 days of beginning a job. Garmon refused, the union sent peaceful pickets to persuade customers and suppliers to stop dealing with Garmon. Garmon claimed that state law applied to grant damages against the Building Trades Council for picketing his business, and federal law did not apply. 

The Superior Court for the County of San Diego found that the union had acted unlawfully under state law, and enjoined the union from picketing until they had won an election and become a collective bargaining agent, awarding $1000 in damages. The NLRB declined jurisdiction for a representation hearing, "presumably because the amount of interstate commerce involved did not meet the Board's monetary standards in taking jurisdiction." The California Supreme Court held, because the NLRB declined jurisdiction, California courts had power over the dispute and the union committed an unfair labor practice under § 8(b)(2) of the National Labor Relations Act of 1935. The US Supreme Court then decided in Guss v. Utah Labor Relations Board, that the refusal of the National Labor Relations Board to assert jurisdiction did not mean the states had power, and vacated the judgment of the California court. The California court set aside the injunction, but still granted an award of damages. It said this was based on tort for unfair labor practices under the Civil Code. The case was granted certiorari again to decide if the California court had jurisdiction to award damages arising out of peaceful union activity which it could not enjoin.

Judgment
The Supreme Court held that the California Supreme Court was not entitled to award remedies against a union for picketing, because if "an activity is arguably subject to §7 or §8 of the Act, the States as well as the federal courts must defer to the exclusive competence of the National Labor Relations Board". This was true, even though the NLRB had not given any ruling on the dispute "because the amount of interstate commerce involved did not meet the Board's monetary standards in taking jurisdiction..."

Frankfurter J gave the court's judgment.

See also

United States labor law

References

External links
 

United States labor case law
1959 in United States case law
United States Supreme Court cases
United States Supreme Court cases of the Warren Court